The 1928–29 Scottish Division One season of Association football was won by Rangers by sixteen points over nearest rival Celtic. Third Lanark and Raith Rovers finished 19th and 20th respectively and were relegated to the 1929–30 Scottish Division Two.

League table

Results

References 

 Statto.com

1928–29 Scottish Football League
Scottish Division One seasons
Scot